Reptile Ride is the title of Amoral's third album which was released in Japan on August 10, 2007 and on August 15, 2007 in the rest of the world.

Track listing

Credits

Band members
Niko Kalliojärvi - vocals
Erkki Silvennoinen - bass
Ben Varon - guitar
Silver Ots - guitar
Juhana Karlsson - drums

External links
 kvltsite.com review
 https://web.archive.org/web/20100131203224/http://www.amoralweb.com/

2007 albums
Amoral (band) albums